William Tayloe may refer to:

 William Tayloe (planter) (1599–1655), British immigrant, colonist, and planter
 William Tayloe (the nephew) (1645–1710), his nephew, American plantation owner
 William Henry Tayloe (1799–1871), American plantation owner, horse breeder, businessman and land speculator